The Wisconsin Institute for Discovery (WID) is an interdisciplinary public research institute focused on science on the University of Wisconsin–Madison campus in Madison, Wisconsin. The institute is located in the Discovery Building, which also houses the private biomedical-focused Morgridge Institute for Research and the Wisconsin Alumni Research Foundation's Town Center, with which WID regularly partners to deliver outreach programming and public events. WID opened in 2010 with five research themes, which have since evolved as collaborations crossed disciplinary boundaries and new research teams formed.

The Wisconsin Institute for Discovery is led by Jo Handelsman, who was appointed in February, 2017, after serving in the Obama White House's Office of Science and Technology Policy.

Research 
The faculty of the WID hold dual appointments at the institute and in departments across campus, including data science and visualization, tissue engineering and nanomedicine, -omics, health, agriculture, and complex systems. WID's approach to science involves calling on a broad community to identify and find solutions to big problems, encouraging interdisciplinary thought and action, and championing the Wisconsin Idea as a central tenet.

WID houses "Discovery Hubs" that are designed to be integrators for the campus community, generating new ideas that nucleate new collaborative projects. The hubs make use of WID expertise to provide services to other researchers in applying specialized tools to a range of problems extending beyond the scope of WID's programs. The hubs are the Data Science Hub, the Multi-Omics Hub, and the Illuminating Discovery Hub.

References

University of Wisconsin–Madison
Research institutes in Wisconsin